Andrey Kuznetsov (born September 24, 1972, Nizhnyaya Tura) is a Russian political figure and a deputy of the 8th State Dumas.
 
From 1993 to 2003, Kuznetsov worked as a correspondent and editor-in-chief in a number of Yekaterinburg media outlets. From 2003 to 2012, he was the Executive Director of the Ural Institute of Applied Politics and Economics. In 2012, he was appointed the First Deputy Head of Administration of the Governor of Sverdlovsk Oblast. From 2013 to 2017, Kuznetsov served as an advisor to Sergey Mironov. From 2020 to 2021, he was the Deputy Chief of Staff of the A Just Russia — For Truth  faction in the State Duma. Since September 2021, he has served as deputy of the 8th State Duma.

References
 

 

1972 births
Living people
A Just Russia politicians
21st-century Russian politicians
Eighth convocation members of the State Duma (Russian Federation)
People from Sverdlovsk Oblast